Juan Sebastián Cabal and Robert Farah were the two-time defending champions, but lost in the second round to Rohan Bopanna and Denis Shapovalov.

Marcel Granollers and Horacio Zeballos won the title, defeating Jérémy Chardy and Fabrice Martin in the final, 6–4, 5–7, [10–8].

Seeds

Draw

Finals

Top half

Bottom half

References

External links
Draw

Men's Doubles